The 2020 SBS Drama Awards, presented by Seoul Broadcasting System (SBS), was held on 31 December 2020 at 21.00 (KST) at SBS Prism Tower, Sangam-dong, Mapo-gu, Seoul. This year being the 30th anniversary of the founding of SBS, the awards ceremony was announced by Park Eun-bin and Jo Byung-gyu in a teaser on 17 December 2020. The show was hosted by Shin Dong-yup and Kim Yoo-jung. In order to observe COVID-19 pandemic safety protocols, the awards presentation was held without an on-site audience.

Winners and nominees

Special performances

See also 
 2020 KBS Drama Awards
 2020 MBC Drama Awards
 7th APAN Star Awards

References

External links 
 

Seoul Broadcasting System original programming
2020 television awards
SBS Drama Awards
2020 in South Korea
2020 in South Korean television
December 2020 events in South Korea